The Gold Prospectors Association of America (GPAA) is an organization dedicated to finding and mining gold on a small or recreational scale. It has gold claims across America and members can work the claims for a yearly fee. The club is headquartered in Temecula, California. Most, if not all GPAA, activities are in the United States. The organization was founded in 1968 "to preserve and promote the great heritage of the North American Prospector." The association opposes mining methods that harm the environment and is against anti-prospecting bureaucracy. As of 2007, the GPAA is an independent company.

See also
Prospecting
Gold prospecting
Recreational gold mining
Placer mining

References

External links
Gold Prospectors Association of America

Clubs and societies in the United States
Gold prospectors
American gold prospectors
Temecula, California